Albion is a city in Calhoun County in the south central region of the Lower Peninsula of the U.S. state of Michigan. The population was 7,700 at the 2020 census and is part of the Battle Creek Metropolitan Statistical Area.

The earliest English-speaking settlers also referred to this area as The Forks, because it is situated at the confluence of the north and south branches of the Kalamazoo River. In the early 20th century, immigrants came to Albion from a variety of eastern European nations, including the current Lithuania and Russia. More recently, Hispanic or Latino immigrants have come from Mexico and Central America. The Festival of the Forks has been held annually since 1967 to celebrate Albion's diverse ethnic heritage.

Since the 19th century, several major manufacturers were established here and Albion became known as a factory town. This has changed with the closure of several manufacturers. In the 21st century, Albion's culture is changing to that of a college town whose residents have a strong interest in technology and sustainability issues.  Albion College is a private liberal arts college with a student population of about 1,250. Albion is a sister city with Noisy-le-Roi, France.

History
The first European-American settler, Tenney Peabody, arrived in 1833 along with his brother-in-law Charles Blanchard, and another young man named Clark Dowling. Peabody's family followed soon after. In 1835, the Albion Company, a land development company formed by Jesse Crowell, platted a village. Peabody's wife was asked to name the settlement. She considered the name "Peabodyville", but selected "Albion" instead, after the former residence of Jesse Crowell. Crowell was appointed in 1838 as the first US postmaster here.

Many early settlers migrated here from western New York and New England, part of a movement after construction of the Erie Canal, and opening of new lands in Michigan and other Great Lakes territories. They first developed agriculture and it became a rural trading village. Settlers were strong supporters of education and in 1835, Methodists established Albion College affiliated with their church. The first classes were held in Albion in 1843. The college was known by a few other names before 1861. At that time it was fully authorized to confer four-year degrees on both men and women.

Albion incorporated as a village in 1855, following construction of the railroad here in 1852, which stimulated development. It became a city in 1885.

Mills were constructed to operate on the water power of the forks of the Kalamazoo River. They were the first industry in the town, used to process lumber, grain and other products to build the village. Albion quickly became a mill town as well as an agricultural market. The river that powered industry also flooded the town.

In the Great Flood of 1908, there was severe property damage. In February, snowstorms had deposited several feet of snow across the region. Heavy rains and warmer conditions in early March created water saturation in the ground and risk of flooding because of the high flow in the rivers. After the Homer Dam broke around 3 p.m. on March 7, the Kalamazoo River flooded Albion. By midnight, the bridges surrounding town were underwater. Six buildings in Albion collapsed, resulting in more than US$125,000 in damage (1908 dollars). The town struggled to recover.

In the late 19th and early 20th centuries, numerous Lithuanian and other Eastern European immigrants settled here, most working for the Albion Malleable Iron Company, and some in the coal mine north of town. The iron company had initially made agricultural implements but around World War I shifted to making automotive parts. The Malleable merged in 1969 with the Hayes Corporation, becoming the Hayes-Albion Corporation. Now known as a division of Harvard Industries, the company continues to produce automotive castings in Albion. Molder Statue Park in downtown is dedicated to the many molders who dealt with molten iron.

There were soon enough Lithuanians in town to establish Holy Ascension Orthodox Church, which they built in 1916. It is part of the Orthodox Church in America. Today its services are in English.

The city had its peak of population in 1960. In 1973 Albion was named an All-America City by the National Civic League. It celebrated winning the award on May 15, 1974, when the Governor of Michigan, William Milliken, and many dignitaries came to town. In 1975 the closure of a major factory began a difficult period of industrial restructuring and decline in jobs and population.

Since that time citizens have mobilized, founding the Albion Community Foundation in 1968. They formed the Albion Volunteer Service Organization in the 1980s, with support from Albion College, to address the challenge of diminishing economic opportunity.

Key to the City Honor Bestowed:

1964: Aunt Jemima visited Albion on January 25.
1960s: Columnist Ann Landers was presented with a key upon her visit to Starr Commonwealth for Boys.

Law and government 
Albion has a Council-Manager form of government. City residents elect a Mayor at-large and City Council members from each of six single-member districts. The council in turn selects a City Manager to handle day-to-day affairs of the city. The mayor presides over and is a voting member of the council. Council members are elected to four-year terms, staggered every two years. A mayor is elected every two years.  The city levies an income tax of 1 percent on residents and 0.5 percent on nonresidents.

Geography
Albion is positioned 42.24 degrees north of the equator and 84.75 degrees west of the prime meridian.

Climate

Demographics

2010 population by gender/age

2010 population by ethnicity

2010 population by race

Transportation

Major highways

Rail
Amtrak, the national passenger rail system, provides daily service to Albion, operating its Wolverine both directions between Chicago, Illinois and Pontiac, Michigan, via Detroit.

Bus
Greyhound Lines provides daily intercity city bus service to Albion between Chicago, Illinois and Detroit.

Notable people 

 Kim Cascone, musician, composer, owner of Silent Records; born in Albion
 M. F. K. Fisher, food writer, born in Albion
 Ada Iddings Gale, author, lived and buried in Albion
 Frank Joranko, football player and coach for Albion College
 LaVall Jordan, head men's basketball coach for Butler University, born in Albion
 Martin Wells Knapp, American Methodist evangelist who founded the Pilgrim Holiness Church and God's Bible School and College, born in Albion.
 Bill Laswell, jazz bassist, record producer and record label owner; raised in Albion
 Jerome D. Mack, banker, director of Las Vegas hotels Riviera and Dunes, founder of University of Nevada, Las Vegas; born in Albion
 Deacon McGuire, professional baseball player for 26 seasons, lived in Albion
 Gary Lee Nelson, composer, pioneer in electronic and computer music; grew up in Albion
 Jack Vaughn, Assistant Secretary of State, Ambassador to Panama and Colombia, and Director of the Peace Corps (1966-1969); grew up in Albion
 The War and Treaty, musical duo

See also
 Holy Ascension Orthodox Church

References

External links

 City of Albion official website
 Albion City Information Page 
 Albion District Library
 Albion Michigan Home Page
 Historical Albion Michigan
 Festival of the Forks – Albion's annual music and food festival by the forks of the Kalamazoo River
 The Greater Albion Chamber of Commerce
 Albion Michigan Community Foundation – For Good. For Ever.

 
Cities in Calhoun County, Michigan
Populated places established in 1835
1835 establishments in Michigan Territory